The Union High School building is located in Black River Falls, Wisconsin.

History
The building was used as a high school until 1897. Since then, it was used as an elementary school and currently for elderly housing. It was listed on the National Register of Historic Places in 1978 and on the State Register of Historic Places in 1989.

References

School buildings on the National Register of Historic Places in Wisconsin
Residential buildings on the National Register of Historic Places in Wisconsin
National Register of Historic Places in Jackson County, Wisconsin
Public high schools in Wisconsin
Public elementary schools in Wisconsin
Schools in Jackson County, Wisconsin
Defunct schools in Wisconsin
Housing for the elderly in the United States
Second Empire architecture in Wisconsin
Brick buildings and structures
School buildings completed in 1871
1871 establishments in Wisconsin